This page lists the World Best Year Performance in the year 1989 in both the men's and the women's race walking distances: 10 km, 20 km and 50 km (outdoor).

Abbreviations
All times shown are in hours:minutes:seconds

Men's 20 km

Records

1989 World Year Ranking

Men's 50 km

Records

1989 World Year Ranking

Women's 10 km

Records

1989 World Year Ranking

See also
1989 IAAF World Race Walking Cup

References
maik-richter
alltime-athletics

1989
Race Walking Year Ranking, 1989